Coenotephria tophaceata is a species of moth of the family Geometridae. It is found in mountains of central and southern Europe.

The wingspan is 32–36 mm. There are two generations per year with adults on wing from May to July and again from August to September.

The larvae feed on Galium species, including Galium album, Galium sylvaticum, Galium lucidum and Galium verum. There are also records for Asperula species. Pupation takes place on the ground in a slight spinning. The species overwinters in the larval stage.

Subspecies
 Coenotephria tophaceata tophaceata
 Coenotephria tophaceata jurassica Vorbrodt & Muller-Rutz, 1914

References

External links

Euroleps.ch
Gbif.org
Lepiforum.de

Moths described in 1775
Larentiinae
Moths of Europe
Taxa named by Michael Denis
Taxa named by Ignaz Schiffermüller